In graphics design, a vector path is a drawn or generated outline that represents a series of smooth straight (vector) lines instead of raster dots (or bitmap 
dots). Therefore, the paths are independent of resolution. They also have a special feature that bitmaps and vectors do not have - the ability to change based on their new size or shape.

Vector graphics